The Men's 10 metre air rifle event at the 2012 Olympic Games took place on 30 July 2012 at the Royal Artillery Barracks.

The event consisted of two rounds: a qualifier and a final. In the qualifier, each shooter fired 60 shots with an air rifle at 10 metres distance from the standing position. Scores for each shot were in increments of 1, with a maximum score of 10. Defending gold medalist Abhinav Bindra failed to qualify for the final.

The top 8 shooters in the qualifying round moved on to the final round. There, they fired an additional 10 shots. These shots scored in increments of .1, with a maximum score of 10.9. The total score from all 70 shots was used to determine final ranking.

Gun - 4.5 mm Calibre Rifle Maximum 5.5 kg
Bullet - 4.5 mm Pellets
BullsEye - 0.55 mm
Time for Each Shot - 75 seconds

Alin Moldoveanu of Romania won the gold medal by scoring 702.1. Gagan Narang won the Bronze Medal in the Men's 10 m Air Rifle Event at the 2012 Summer Olympics in London with a final score of 701.1.  It was India's second consecutive medal in the event.

Records
Prior to this competition, the existing world and Olympic records were as follows.

Qualification round

Final

References

Shooting at the 2012 Summer Olympics
Men's events at the 2012 Summer Olympics